During the 1983–84 English football season, Aston Villa competed in the Football League First Division.

Graham Turner left Shrewsbury after six seasons to take charge of Aston Villa in the summer of 1984.

Season overview
27 Aug 1983: The Football League season commences. A seven-goal thriller at Villa Park sees Aston Villa beat local rivals West Bromwich Albion 4–3.

31 Aug 1983: Notts County, West Ham United,  Villa and Arsenal all win their first two matches of the First Division season to lead the table at the end of August.

24 Sep 1983: Southampton's title challenge is hit with a 1–0 defeat away to Aston Villa, who go sixth in the table.

28 Sep 1983: All four English entrants in the UEFA Cup – Watford, Nottingham Forest, Tottenham Hotspur and Aston Villa – progress to the second round.

23 Oct 1983: The only league action of the day sees Wolves draw 1–1 at home to local rivals Aston Villa.

30 Oct 1983: Tony Woodcock scores five goals in Arsenal's 6–2 away win over Aston Villa

2 Nov 1983: Tottenham eliminate Dutch side Feyenoord 6–2 on aggregate in the second round of the UEFA Cup. Watford eliminate Levski Sofia from the competition and Nottingham Forest oust PSV Eindhoven, but Aston Villa are edged out 4–3 on aggregate by Spartak Moscow.

5 Nov 1983 – Peter Withe scores twice as Aston Villa inflict a 2–1 defeat on Manchester United at Old Trafford, meaning that Liverpool can return to the top of the table if they win their game tomorrow.

26 Nov 1983: Notts County boost their bid to keep clear of the relegation zone with a 5–2 win over Aston Villa.

30 Nov 1983: In the League Cup, there is a local derby at The Hawthorns, where Aston Villa beat West Bromwich Albion 2–1.

3 Dec 1983: West Ham United are beaten 1–0 by Aston Villa at Villa Park.

17 Dec 1983: Liverpool return to the top of the First Division with a 5–0 home win over Notts County. Aston Villa keep up the pressure on the leading pack with a 4–0 home win over Ipswich Town. Caretaker manager Don Howe begins his spell in charge of Arsenal with a 3–1 home win over Watford. Coventry City miss the chance to close the gap on the leaders with a goalless draw at Norwich. QPR go fourth with a 2–0 home win over Everton.

20 Jan 1984: Ian Rush scores a hat-trick in Liverpool's 3–1 away win over Aston Villa in the First Division, increasing their lead at the top to five points, although their nearest challengers Manchester United can cut the gap to two points if they win at the weekend.

15 Feb 1984: Everton beat Aston Villa 2–0 in the League Cup semi-final first leg.

18 Feb 1984: In the First Division, Arsenal draw 1–1 with Aston Villa at Highbury.

22 Feb 1984: Despite losing 1–0 to Aston Villa in the semi-final second leg, Everton are through to the League Cup final, securing them their first cup final for seven years.

25 Feb 1984: Wolves are now 13 points adrift of safety after losing 4–0 to local rivals Aston Villa in the First Division at Villa Park.

3 Mar 1984: The Merseyside derby at Goodison Park ends in a 1–1 draw, allowing Manchester United to cut Liverpool's lead to two points by beating Aston Villa 3–0 at Villa Park.

13 Mar 1984: Midweek action in the First Division includes a six-goal thriller at Highfield Road, where local rivals Coventry City and Aston Villa draw 3–3.

17 Mar 1984: Nottingham Forest's title challenge is fading as they go down 1–0 at Aston Villa, as is West Ham's following a 4–1 defeat to Leicester City at Filbert Street.

18 Apr 1984: Tottenham Hotspur remain in the hunt for another top-five finish by beating Aston Villa 2–1.

First Division

League table

FA Cup

League Cup

Semi-final

UEFA Cup

First round

Second round

References

Aston Villa F.C. seasons
Aston Villa